Fingerpainting is an album by the experimental rock band Red Krayola, released in 1999 by Drag City. The album contains songs that were originally worked on by the 1960s line-up of the band.

Critical reception
The Dallas Observer wrote: "It's a challenging piece of work, but a rewarding one: Once you get past their peculiar handling, the songs are among the most accessible the band has released, and after a few plays, even the most difficult sections reveal a wealth of structure and detail." The Stranger wrote that "for the uninitiated, it'll leave you completely befuddled." CMJ New Music Report called the album "a long, strange, headphone trip worth taking."

Track listing

Personnel 
Frederick Barthelme
Steve Cunningham
David Grubbs
Bobby Henschen
George Hurley
Albert Oehlen
Stephen Prina
Elisa Randazzo
Mayo Thompson
Tom Watson
Christopher Williams
Sandy Yang

References

External links 
 

1999 albums
Drag City (record label) albums
Red Krayola albums